Verbena bracteata is a species of verbena known by the common names bracted vervain, bigbract verbena, prostrate vervain, and carpet vervain. It is native to North America where it is widespread, occurring throughout the continent except for northern Canada and southern Mexico. It occurs in many types of habitat, especially disturbed areas. It typically blooms between the months of May and October. This annual or biennial herb produces several hairy, spreading stems up to 30 centimeters long forming a low mat on the ground. The hairy leaves are toothed or lobed. The inflorescence is a spike of flowers which is dense with long, pointed, leaflike bracts each up to 8 millimeters long. Each small tubular flower is about half a centimeter wide and white to pale purple in color.

References

External links
Jepson Manual Treatment
Washington Burke Museum
Illinois Wildflowers
Photo gallery

bracteata
Flora of Western Canada
Flora of Ontario
Flora of the Northwestern United States
Flora of the North-Central United States
Flora of the Northeastern United States
Flora of the Southwestern United States
Flora of the South-Central United States
Flora of the Southeastern United States
Flora without expected TNC conservation status